C/2010 U3 (Boattini) is the hyperbolic comet with the longest observation arc and took around a million years to complete half an orbit from its furthest distance in the Oort cloud. It was discovered on 31 October 2010 by Andrea Boattini in images taken with the Mount Lemmon Survey's 1.5-m reflector. The perihelion point is outside of the inner Solar System. 

The comet has an observation arc of 15 years allowing a very good estimate of the inbound (original) and outbound (future) orbits. The orbit of a long-period comet is properly obtained when the osculating orbit is computed at an epoch after leaving the planetary region and is calculated with respect to the center of mass of the Solar System. Hui et al 2019 has a similar inbound orbital period of 2 million years.

The generic JPL Small-Body Database browser uses a near-perihelion epoch of 2017-Jun-01 which is before the comet left the planetary region and makes the highly eccentric aphelion point inaccurate since it does not account for any planetary perturbations after that epoch. The heliocentric JPL Small-Body Database solution also does not account for the combined mass of the Sun+Jupiter.

Precovery images from November 2005 when the comet was active  from the Sun are known. The comet was seen to outburst in 2009 and 2017. Supervolatiles such as CO and CO2 can generate activity when a comet is this far from the Sun.

References 
 

Non-periodic comets
20101031
Oort cloud